KDTX-TV, virtual channel 58 (UHF digital channel 21), is a Trinity Broadcasting Network (TBN) owned-and-operated television station licensed to Dallas, Texas, United States, and serving the Dallas–Fort Worth metroplex. The station's studios are located at TBN's International Production Center in Irving, and its transmitter is located in Cedar Hill, Texas.

History
The UHF channel 58 allocation in the Dallas–Fort Worth market was initially applied for broadcasting use by the Metroplex Broadcasting Company (owned by Adam Clayton Powell III (son of civil rights activist and congressman Adam Clayton Powell, Jr.) and former KDFW (channel 4) anchor/reporter Barbara Harrison) for a television station under the call letters KDIA (a Spanish translation for the word "day"). The station was founded on January 15, 1985, however it is not known if it ever signed on.

KDTX-TV first signed on the air on February 9, 1987 (the call letters had previously been used by a radio station on 102.9 FM, now KDMX); it was built and signed on by the Trinity Broadcasting Network. In recent years, KDTX has been considered TBN's second-most important television station (after its flagship station, KTBN-TV in Santa Ana, California), particularly as the Dallas–Fort Worth market has a large religious base. TBN has since moved several of its operations, including some production facilities, to the Metroplex.

Subchannels

References

External links

Television channels and stations established in 1987
1987 establishments in Texas
Trinity Broadcasting Network affiliates
Television stations in the Dallas–Fort Worth metroplex